Robert Gittler was an American writer best known for writing the screenplay for The Buddy Holly Story, an Oscar-winning (for its music) motion picture.

Gittler committed suicide in 1978, two days before the theatrical release of The Buddy Holly Story.

References

External links

American male screenwriters
Suicides in California
1978 deaths
Year of birth missing
20th-century American male writers
20th-century American screenwriters
1978 suicides